Hélder Maurílio da Silva Ferreira (13 April 1988), known as Hélder Maurílio or simply Hélder, is a Brazilian footballer who plays for Londrina. Mainly a right back, he can also play as a winger.

Club career

Juventude 
Helder started his career at Juventude.

Nancy 
In 2008, Helder was transferred to Nancy, signing a 5-year deal.

Rapid București 
On 23 July 2009 the Ligue 1 club AS Nancy has the 21-year-old Brazilian right defender loaned out for the 2009/2010 season with a purchase option to Rapid.

Dinamo București 
In the summer of 2010, he was loaned in Romania again, this time to Dinamo București, but with an option for Dinamo to buy the player for 4 years. Shortly after he joined Dinamo, he had a conflict with team's coach, Ioan Andone, and he decided to leave, signing with Liga I rivals FC Timişoara.

Politehnica Timișoara 
On 3 September 2010, Helder was loaned out this time on FC Timişoara. After he signed the contract, said: "I decided to come to Timișoara because for me it's better. I know that Poli wanted me but I did not come before then because I was advised. I was told <go to Dinamo, go to Dinamo>. But for my career what I did was a disaster. I hope Timișoara be my salvation. I know this is a strong group here at Poli. And if I am are here in Timișoara is normal I want to win the championship with Poli". He chose the number 20. He made an ideal debut for Poli scoring one goal in 1–1 draw against Astra Ploiești. On 16 June 2011 his contract expired and he returns to Nancy.

Honours
Internacional
Campeonato Gaúcho: 2013

References

External links
 
 

1988 births
Living people
People from Ribeirão Preto
Brazilian footballers
Association football defenders
Brazilian expatriate footballers
Brazilian expatriate sportspeople in France
Brazilian expatriate sportspeople in Romania
Expatriate footballers in France
Expatriate footballers in Romania
Campeonato Brasileiro Série A players
Campeonato Brasileiro Série B players
Campeonato Brasileiro Série C players
Ligue 1 players
Liga I players
Liga II players
Esporte Clube Juventude players
AS Nancy Lorraine players
FC Rapid București players
FC Dinamo București players
FC Politehnica Timișoara players
Sport Club Internacional players
Ceará Sporting Club players
Clube Náutico Capibaribe players
América Futebol Clube (MG) players
Goiás Esporte Clube players
Joinville Esporte Clube players
Boa Esporte Clube players
Grêmio Esportivo Brasil players
Londrina Esporte Clube players
Footballers from São Paulo (state)